Waqutu (Quechua for the name of an apu (god) / a variety of potatoes, also spelled Waqoto) is an archaeological site in Peru. It is located in the Cusco Region, Cusco Province, in the districts San Jerónimo and Saylla.

References

Archaeological sites in Cusco Region
Archaeological sites in Peru